Vezins is a commune in the Maine-et-Loire department in western France.

Geography
The Èvre river has its source in the commune, 1.5 km north east from the village itself.

Demography

See also
Communes of the Maine-et-Loire department

References

External links

 Vezins on the Maine-et-Loire Web site

Communes of Maine-et-Loire